Brevator is an unincorporated community in Lincoln County, in the U.S. state of Missouri.

History
Brevator was platted in 1880, and named after John Brevator, the original owner of the town site. A post office called Brevator was established in 1880, and remained in operation until 1932.

References

Unincorporated communities in Lincoln County, Missouri
Unincorporated communities in Missouri